Fionn Bheinn is a Scottish mountain located south of Loch Fannich in the north western highlands. It has a height of  933 m (3061 ft) and is listed as a Munro. The south side of the mountain is a shallow, smooth grassy slope, but its north face is steeper and is considered more impressive.

Fionn Bheinn is most often climbed from the village of Achnasheen to the south, with the normal route following the burn called Allt Achadh na Sine to the nose at Creagan nan Laogh, and then up the grassy slopes to the summit. An ascent or descent via the east ridge is also common, this route giving better views of the north side of the mountain.

References 

Munros
Marilyns of Scotland
Mountains and hills of the Northwest Highlands